This article contains information about the literary events and publications of 1574.

Events
unknown dates
Exercicio quotidiano, a religious manuscript in the Nahuatl language, is created.
The Russian printer Ivan Fyodorov prints the second edition of his Apostolos and the first Azbuka (alphabet book) in Cyrillic script.

Prose
Jean-Antoine de Baïf – 
Matthias Flacius et al. – Magdeburg Centuries
Nicolás Monardes – Historia medicinal de las cosas que se traen de nuestras Indias Occidentales
Elizabeth Tyrwhitt – Morning and Evening Prayers

Poetry
See 1574 in poetry

Births
September – Thomas Gataker, English theologian (died 1654)
September 18 – Claudio Achillini, Italian philosopher, theologian and poet (died 1640)
November 4 – Erycius Puteanus, Dutch philologist (died 1646)
Unknown dates
Richard Barnfield, English poet (died 1627)
Nicolas Coeffeteau, French theologian, poet and historian (died 1623)
John Day, English dramatist (died c. 1640)
Feng Menglong (馮夢龍), Chinese vernacular poet (died 1645)
Paul Laymann, Austrian moralist (died 1635)

Deaths
January 30 – Damião de Góis, Portuguese humanist philosopher (born 1502)
April 17 – Joachim Camerarius, German classical scholar (born 1500)
June 27 – Giorgio Vasari, artist and biographer of artists (born 1511)
November 7 – Solomon Luria, Jewish legal author (born 1510)
November 28 – Georg Major, German Lutheran theologian (born 1502)
December 10 – Ascanio Condivi, biographer of Michelangelo (born 1525)
Unknown dates
Gáspár Heltai (Kaspar Helth), Transylvanian writer in German (born c. 1490)
Paulus Manutius, Venetian printer (born 1512)
Antonio Minturno, Italian poet and critic (born 1500)
Cornelio Musso, Italian orator and writer (born 1511)
Ioannes Sommerus, Saxon theologian (born 1542)

References

Years of the 16th century in literature